Evans Correctional Institution is a medium-security state prison for men located in Bennettsville, Marlboro County, South Carolina, owned and operated by the South Carolina Department of Corrections.  

The facility was opened in 1989 and has a capacity of 1342 inmates held at medium security.

References

Prisons in South Carolina
Buildings and structures in Marlboro County, South Carolina
1989 establishments in South Carolina